Tui bei tu is a Chinese prophecy book from the 7th-century Tang dynasty. The book is known for predicting the future of China, and is written by Li Chunfeng and Yuan Tiangang (袁天罡), and has been compared to the works of famous western prophet Nostradamus. Well known in Hong Kong, Macau and Taiwan, the book was previously banned in the People's Republic of China under the Communist party for superstition (one of the “Four Olds”), though it has since reappeared in street-side book stalls in the 1990s as a bestseller.

Description
The book is supposed to contain clues to China's future conveyed through a series of 60 surreal drawings, each accompanied by an equally obscure poem. The title means "Back-Pushing Sketch" and comes from the last illustration.

Each poem is a prophecy, which describes a Chinese historical event that will occur in order. For example, the 36th poem should occur before the 40th poem. Poem number 60 is the last prophecy. Some sources have said that out of the 60 prophecies, 55 of them are supposed to have already been fulfilled. Though just like Nostradamus's work, the interpretations largely depend on the individuals. Some scholars compared the different versions and found the book has been rewritten many times.

Usage
During the end-of-dynasty turmoil, rebels used it to prophesize victory for their cause and thereby drum up public support. As the introduction to one mainland China version of the book explained, Tui Bei Tu is a way of shaping public opinion used by feudal rulers to seize power or consolidate power. It is also similarly used by oppressed people to overthrow their rulers.

In popular culture
 The Hong Kong TVB drama A Change of Destiny mentions the Tui bei tu.

References

External links

 Taiwan Sina book scan images with poem - words are in classic vertical alignment
 Chinese prophecy research group (Traditional Chinese)
 Alexchiu philosophy super I-Ching (English)
 Hinet (Traditional Chinese)
 Cs.columbia.edu (Simplified Chinese)
 Jilm (Simplified Chinese)
 Mmkey (Simplified Chinese)

See also
 I Ching
 Lingqijing
 Lo Shu Square
 Qi Men Dun Jia
 Tung shing
 Jiaobei
 Kau Cim
 Shaobing Song, another famous Chinese prophetic text
 Chinese classic texts

Prophecy
Chinese classic texts
Chinese books of divination